Nassira Belloula (نصيرة بلولة) (born 13 February 1961 in Batna) is an Algerian feminist journalist and writer in French. She is the author of several books, novels, poems, essays, stories and news.

Biography 
Belloula joined the l’Ecole Nationale des Cadres de la Jeunesse in the 1980s. by passing the entrance exam. Belloula began practice as a freelance journalist in 1992. Beginning in 1994, she worked for Algerian newspapers and online news venues including Le Soir d’Algérie, Le Matin, La Nouvelle République, and Liberté. She is a founding member of the Algerian literary magazine, L’Ivrescq.

In 2010, Belloula moved to Montreal, Canada.

Activism and Writing 
Belloulas work deals most significantly with women's issues, including cultural and religious restrictions, education, social relations, traditions, confinement, and violence. She was a founding member of the executive board of the Algerian Human Rights Foundation of the Child and Adolescent (1993-1998). Her 2000 text, Algérie, le massacre des innocents, concerns itself with the massacre of Algerian civilians. She served two terms as a member of the Algerian Commission on Human Rights, an affiliate of the United Nations.

Works

Poetry 
 1988: Les Portes du Soleil
 2010: The Gates Of The Sun, translation of Les Portes du Soleil

Fiction 
 1998 : Le Revanche de May
 2003 : Rebelle en toute demeure
 2008 : Djemina
 2008 : Visa pour la haine
 2014 : Terre des femmes

Non-Fiction 
 2000 : Algérie, le massacre des innocents
 2005 : Conversations à Alger, quinze auteurs se dévoilent
 2006 : Les Belles Algériennes, confidences d'écrivaines
 2009 : Soixante ans d'écriture féminine en Algérie

Anthologies 
 2008 : Arbres Bleus, fantasmes naufragés
 2009 : Tamazgha francophone au Féminin

References

Algerian journalists
1961 births
Living people
People from Batna, Algeria
Algerian women novelists
Algerian novelists
Algerian essayists
Algerian women's rights activists
Algerian feminists
Algerian women poets
20th-century Algerian poets
21st-century Algerian poets
20th-century essayists
21st-century essayists
20th-century women writers
20th-century Algerian writers
20th-century Algerian women writers
21st-century Algerian writers
21st-century Algerian women writers
Algerian women journalists